Lite may refer to:

Food and drugs
Diet food, food or beverage that is part of a weight loss program or diet
Diet soda, a version of soda pop
Low-alcohol beer, beer with little or no alcohol content
Miller Lite, a brand of light beer
Lights (cigarette type), a cigarette with a milder flavor

Media

Music
Lite (band), a Japanese band
Lite (radio station), a Malaysian radio station
106.7 Lite FM, a branding for WLTW, a variety radio station in New York City as part of iHeartRadio

Other media
London Lite, a British newspaper
Lite TV, a television channel

People
Lori Lite (born 1961), American author, producer and entrepreneur

Places
Líté, a municipality in the Czech Republic

Computing
Lightweight software
Crippleware, software that purposely has some functions removed
Litecoin, a crypto-currency

Other uses
 A piece of glass in a window or door

See also
Light (disambiguation)
Lite FM (disambiguation)
Lite-Brite, an electric toy that allows lit pictures to be created
Lyte (surname)